Henchir-Ezzguidane or Henchir el Zguidane  is a locality in Tunisia.
The site is notable for the significant Roman Era ruins including a Byzantine Fortress Réservoirs and aqueduct. Archeological survey has been conducted by the French in the 19th century.

References

Archaeological sites in Tunisia
Roman towns and cities in Tunisia
Populated places in Tunisia